(7474) 1992 TC is a large sized M-type asteroid discovered by Robert H. McNaught in 1992. It is notably one of a few similar M-type asteroids, including the named asteroids 4660 Nereus and 65803 Didymos, which can be reached easily by spacecraft from Earth. M-type asteroids are thought to be composed primarily of nickel and iron, which if proven to be true means that 7474 (1992 TC) may one day become an important source of raw materials in space.

With an absolute magnitude of 18.0, the asteroid is about 670–1500 meters in diameter. On 2031-Aug-11 the asteroid will pass  from Mars.

References

External links 
 
 
 

007474
Discoveries by Robert H. McNaught
19921001